Lana Abdel Rahman (Arabic: لنا عبد الرحمن) is a Lebanese writer and journalist. She studied at the Lebanese University in Beirut and the American University in Cairo. She lives in Cairo and works as a journalist. Abdel Rahman is the author of three novels and two short story collections. In 2009, she was chosen as one of the eight participants in the inaugural IPAF Nadwa (writers' workshop). An extract from her latest novel Song for Margaret was published in the Nadwa anthology under the title "Letters to Yann Andrea".

References

External links
 Author's official website

Lebanese women novelists
Lebanese novelists
Lebanese women short story writers
Lebanese short story writers
Lebanese women journalists
Lebanese journalists
Living people
Year of birth missing (living people)
21st-century novelists
21st-century short story writers
21st-century journalists
21st-century Lebanese writers
21st-century Lebanese women writers
Lebanese University alumni
The American University in Cairo alumni
Lebanese expatriates in Egypt